School District 41 or SD41 may refer to:

Canada:
 Burnaby School District

United States:
 Canton School District 41-1
 Glen Ellyn School District 41
 Lake Villa School District 41
 Rock Island–Milan School District 41
 St. Maries Joint School District 41